Neuroleadership refers to the application of findings from neuroscience to the field of leadership. The term neuroleadership was first coined by David Rock in 2006  in the US publication Strategy+Business.

Neuroleadership is not without its critics. They question whether having scientific brain data to back up what was commonly believed adds any value.

References

Further reading

External links
 

Neuroeconomics